Iván Benito Ruíz Cuesta (born March 26, 1977) is a retired volleyball player from Cuba. A one-time Olympian (2000), he played as a wing-spiker and won the gold medal with the Men's National Team at the 2001 World Grand Champions Cup.

Honours
 1997 FIVB World League — 2nd place
 1998 FIVB World League — 1st place
 1999 FIVB World League — 2nd place
 2000 FIVB World League — 8th place
 2000 Olympic Games — 7th place
 2001 FIVB World League — 5th place
 2001 World Grand Champions Cup — 1st place
 2002 FIVB World League — 13th place

References
 FIVB Profile
 sports-reference

1977 births
Living people
Cuban men's volleyball players
Volleyball players at the 2000 Summer Olympics
Olympic volleyball players of Cuba
Place of birth missing (living people)
Pan American Games medalists in volleyball
Pan American Games gold medalists for Cuba
Medalists at the 1999 Pan American Games